The list of Radivoj Korać Cup-winning head coaches shows all head coaches who won the Radivoj Korać Cup, the top-tier national men's professional basketball cup in Serbia.

Winners

Multiple winners

See also
 List of BLS-winning head coaches
 Radivoj Korać Cup MVP Award

References

Radivoj Korać Cup
Radivoj Korać Cup-winning head coaches